This is the list of bats of Australia, a sub-list of the list of mammals of Australia.  About 75 bat species are known to occur in Australia, Lord Howe and Christmas Island.  This list principally follows the authoritative reference, Churchill (2008)

List

Pteropodidae 
 Bare-backed fruit bat, Dobsonia magna - Far North Queensland; the species range also includes New Guinea
 Northern blossom bat, Macroglossus minimus - northern Australia and South-east Asia
 Common blossom bat, Syconycteris australis - coastal eastern Australia; New Guinea and Indonesia
 Northern tube-nosed bat, Nyctimene cephalotes - Moa Island in Torres Strait; New Guinea and Indonesia
 Eastern tube-nosed bat, Nyctimene robinsoni - endemic to Australia, found on east coast
 Black flying fox, Pteropus alecto - northern Australia; New Guinea and Indonesia
 Spectacled flying fox, Pteropus conspicillatus - coastal Queensland; New Guinea and Indonesia
 Large-eared flying fox, Pteropus macrotis - Boigu Island in the Torres Strait and New Guinea
 Black-eared flying fox, Pteropus natalis - Christmas Island; the Andaman and Nicobar Islands and Nias and Enggano Islands off Indonesia
 Grey-headed flying fox, Pteropus poliocephalus - endemic species found on the east coast from Rockhampton to Adelaide
 Little red flying fox, Pteropus scapulatus - wide distribution in northern and eastern Australia; also known from New Guinea

Megadermatidae 
 Ghost bat, Macroderma gigas - endemic; found across northern Australia

Rhinolophidae
 Eastern horseshoe bat, Rhinolophus megaphyllus - east coast and New Guinea
 Large-eared horseshoe bat, Rhinolophus robertsi - northeast Queensland.

Hipposideridae
 Dusky leaf-nosed bat, Hipposideros ater - Northern Australia; South East Asia to India
 Fawn leaf-nosed bat, Hipposideros cervinus - far north Queensland; South East Asia
 Diadem leaf-nosed bat, Hipposideros diadema - northern Queensland and South East Asia
 Arnhem leaf-nosed bat, Hipposideros inornatus - Top End of the Northern Territory
 Semon's leaf-nosed bat, Doryrhina semoni - North Queensland and New Guinea
 Northern leaf-nosed bat, Doryrhina stenotis - endemic; the Kimberleys, the Top End and north-western Queensland

Rhinonycteridae
 Orange leaf-nosed bat, Rhinonicteris aurantia - from the Pilbara to north-western Queensland

Emballonuridae
 Yellow-bellied sheath-tailed bat, Saccolaimus flaviventris - endemic species with a wide distribution in mainland Australia
 Papuan sheath-tailed bat, Saccolaimus mixtus - Cape York Peninsula and in New Guinea
 Bare-rumped sheath-tailed bat, Saccolaimus saccolaimus - Northern Australia; South East Asia to India
 Coastal sheath-tailed bat, Taphozous australis - East coast of Queensland and the Torres Stait; recorded a few times in New Guinea
 Common sheath-tailed bat, Taphozous georgianus - endemic: north-western Australia
 Hill's sheath-tailed bat, Taphozous hilli - endemic; central inland Australia
 Arnhem sheath-tailed bat, Taphozous kapalgensis - endemic; Top End of the Northern Territory
 Troughton's sheath-tailed bat, Taphozous troughtoni - endemic; central and north-eastern Queensland

Molossidae
 Great Northern free-tailed bat, Chaerephon jobensis - northern Australia; New Guinea and Indonesia
 East-coast free-tailed bat, Micronomus norfolkensis - endemic; east coast from Brisbane to Bega
 Northern free-tailed bat, Ozimops lumsdenae - endemic, widespread across northern Australia
 Western little free-tailed bat, Ozimops cobourgianus - endemic, northwest coast
 Eastern little free-tailed bat, Ozimops ridei - eastern Australia 
 Cape York free-tailed bat, Ozimops halli - endemic, Cape York and northern Gulf
 Inland free-tailed bat, Ozimops petersi - endemic, arid inland
 South-western free-tailed bat, Ozimops kitcheneri - endemic, south-western Australia
 Southern free-tailed bat, Ozimops planiceps - endemic, south-eastern Australia
 Bristle-faced free-tailed bat, Setirostris eleryi - endemic, central Australia
 White-striped free-tailed bat, Austronomus australis - endemic; mainland Australia.

Miniopteridae
 Little bent-wing bat, Miniopterus australis - east coast; New Guinea and Indonesia
 Common bent-wing bat, Miniopterus orianae - northern and eastern Australia 
 Eastern bent-wing bat, Miniopterus orianae oceanensis - eastern Australia
 Southern bent-wing bat, Miniopterus orianae bassanii - southeast South Australia and western Victoria
 Northern bent-wing bat, Miniopterus orianae orianae - northwest Australia

Vespertilionidae
 Large-eared pied bat, Chalinolobus dwyeri - endemic; western side of the Great Dividing Range from south-western Queensland to southern New South Wales.
 Gould's wattled bat, Chalinolobus gouldii - throughout Australia; Tasmania and Norfolk Island
 Chocolate wattled bat, Chalinolobus morio - endemic; southern and central Australia and Tasmania
 Hoary wattled bat, Chalinolobus nigrogriseus - northern Australia and New Guinea
 Little pied bat, Chalinolobus picatus - endemic; inland Queensland and New South Wales west of the Great Dividing Range
 Western false pipistrelle, Falsistrellus mackenziei - endemic; south-western Australia
 Eastern false pipistrelle, Falsistrellus tasmaniensis - endemic; south-western Queensland, New South Wales
 Flute-nosed bat, Murina florium - Far North Queensland; New Guinea and eastern Indonesia
 Large-footed myotis, Myotis macropus - coastal eastern and northern Australia
 Arnhem long-eared bat, Nyctophilus arnhemensis - endemic; the Top End
 Eastern long-eared bat, Nyctophilus bifax - endemic, north-eastern Australia.
 Lesser long-eared bat, Nyctophilus geoffroyi - endemic; throughout Australia and Tasmania, absent from the east coast of Queensland.
 Gould's long-eared bat, Nyctophilus gouldi - endemic; eastern Australia
 Lord Howe long-eared bat, Nyctophilus howensis - endemic to Lord Howe Island; probably extinct
 Tasmanian long-eared bat, Nyctophilus sherrini - endemic; Tasmania.
 Northern long-eared bat,  Nyctophilus daedalus - endemic; eastern Queensland to Western Australia.
 Western long-eared bat, Nyctophilus major - endemic; south-western Australia
 Western long-eared bat, Nyctophilus major major - endemic; far south-western Australia
 Central long-eared bat, Nyctophilus major tor - endemic; south-western Australia
 South-eastern long-eared bat, Nyctophilus corbeni - endemic; southern eastern Australia
 Pygmy long-eared bat, Nyctophilus walkeri - endemic; the Top End
 Holt's long-eared bat, Nyctophilus holtorum - endemic; far south western Australia
 Golden-tipped bat, Phoniscus papuensis - east coast of Australia; New Guinea
 Forest pipistrelle, Pipistrellus adamsi - Cape York and the Top End
 Christmas Island pipistrelle, Pipistrellus murrayi - endemic to Christmas Island (?)
 Northern pipistrelle, Pipistrellus westralis - coastal Northern Australia
 Rüppell's broad-nosed bat, Scoteanax rueppellii - endemic; coastal Queensland and New South Wales
 Inland broad-nosed bat, Scotorepens balstoni - endemic; arid and semi-arid areas
 Little broad-nosed bat, Scotorepens greyii - endemic; northern and inland Australia
 Eastern broad-nosed bat, Scotorepens orion - endemic; coastal eastern Australia from Brisbane to Melbourne
 Northern broad-nosed bat, Scotorepens sanborni - northern Australia; New Guinea and Indonesia
 Inland forest bat, Vespadelus baverstocki - endemic; found across arid Australia
 Northern cave bat, Vespadelus caurinus - northern Australia
 Large forest bat, Vespadelus darlingtoni - endemic; south-eastern coast and Tasmania
 Yellow-lipped bat, Vespadelus douglasorum - endemic; west Kimberley region
 Finlayson's cave bat, Vespadelus finlaysoni - endemic; wide distribution across arid and semi-arid Australia
 Eastern forest bat, Vespadelus pumilus - endemic; scattered distribution on east coast, Lord Howe Island.
 Southern forest bat, Vespadelus regulus - endemic; southern mainland and Tasmania
 Eastern cave bat, Vespadelus troughtoni - endemic; eastern Australia
 Little forest bat, Vespadelus vulturnus - endemic; south east and Tasmania

See also
 Fauna of Australia

References

External links
 Australasian Bat Society
 Australian Bats at the Australian Museum

 
Bats